Okan Patirer (born 21 February 1979 in Salzgitter) is a Turkish actor.

Filmography

External links 
 Sinematurk.com Okan Patırer Profili 
 TiyatroDünyası.com Okan Patırer Profili 
 Diziler.com Okan Patırer Profili 

1979 births
Living people
People from Salzgitter
Turkish male film actors
German people of Turkish descent
21st-century Turkish singers
21st-century Turkish male singers